Michael Sheinfeld is a former Israeli footballer and manager.

Honours
Championships
1961–62, 1962–63, 1973–74
Israeli Supercup
1974

References

1943 births
Living people
Israeli Jews
Israeli footballers
Hapoel Petah Tikva F.C. players
Shimshon Tel Aviv F.C. players
Maccabi Netanya F.C. players
Liga Leumit players
Hapoel Petah Tikva F.C. managers
Israeli football managers
Association football goalkeepers